Uchenna Ikonne was a Nigerian professor of optometry. In December 2015 he became the 7th Substantive Vice-Chancellor of the Abia State University. having previously served as the Rector, Abia State Polytechnic, Aba – (on Rescue Mission) 2014–2015.

Uche Ikonne was the gubernatorial candidate of People's Democratic Party in Abia State. He died at the National Hospital, Abuja around 4am on January 25, 2023 after suffering from multiple cardiac arrests.

Early life and education
Ikonne was born in Agburuike, Nsulu in Isiala Ngwa North, Abia State. After attending Ngwa High School in Aba of Abia State, he studied optometry at Manila Central University, Philippines. He also graduated from a specialist master's degree programme in Hospital Administration at St. Jude College, also in the Philippines, and on his return to Nigeria in 1985, served as consulting optometrist at the Park Lane General Hospital, Enugu, and obtained a Doctor of Philosophy degree in Environmental Health Science from Abia State University.

Career
From 2010 to 2014, Ikonne served as the Deputy Vice-Chancellor (Academic), Abia State University after then served as Rector, Abia State Polytechnic, Aba – (on Rescue Mission). He became the 7th Substantive Vice-Chancellor, Abia State University in December 2015. He also served as the Head of Department of Optometry in the same institution. While at the Abia State University, he has served as the Acting Dean of Faculty of Health Sciences and Deputy Provost, College of Medicine & Health Sciences. In 1993, he was appointed to a member of the Optometrists and Dispensing Opticians Registration Board of Nigeria. He was also subsequently appointed chairman of the education committee in Abia State. In 2019, he was appointed Chairman, Governing Board of the Optometrists and Dispensing Opticians Registration Board of Nigeria (ODORBN) and served on the board till 2022. Ikonne won the African Optometric Educator Award of the year 2003 and the Distinguished merit Award of the Nigerian Optometric Association, 2006.

References

Living people
Nigerian optometrists
Nigerian male writers
Academic staff of Abia State University
Igbo academics
Vice-Chancellors of Abia State University Uturu
Year of birth missing (living people)